Meiendorfer Weg (Meiendorf Lane) is a rapid transit station located in the Hamburg quarter of Volksdorf, Germany. The station was opened in 1925 and is served by Hamburg U-Bahn line U1.

History
The station was constructed under the name of Volksdorf-Süd (Volksdorf South) from 1912 to 1914, but only opened on 1 April 1925 on the Walddörfer railway line. During the first years of operation, the station was thought to be not needed because of the sparsely populated rural environment. When the station was opened for test purposes in 1925 though, it was surprisingly well frequented so it remained open ever since.

Unlike other stations on the line, Meiendorfer Weg was originally constructed without an entrance building, but a small hall was added after World War II. The platform roof, which was originally made of concrete, was probably also added later on. In 1983, it was replaced by a steel roof.

Originally, near the station, a third track without a platform was located. Built for goods transports of Altrahlstedt-Wohldorfer Kleinbahn (local railway), it was later dismantled at Meiendorfer Weg station. Further south, near Berne station, it was re-built and used for brake tests and other U-Bahn test driving starting from Farmsen railway workshop.

A lift was added at Meiendorfer Weg in October 2018.

Service

Trains  
Meiendorfer Weg is served by Hamburg U-Bahn line U1. Departures are every 10 minutes; however, during certain peak times, trains run every 5 minutes. The travel time to Hamburg Hauptbahnhof takes about 27 minutes.

See also 

 List of Hamburg U-Bahn stations

References

External links 

 Line and route network plans at hvv.de 

Hamburg U-Bahn stations in Hamburg
Buildings and structures in Wandsbek
U1 (Hamburg U-Bahn) stations
Transport infrastructure completed in 1914
1914 establishments in Germany
Railway stations in Germany opened in 1925